Hermitage High School is a public school located in the West End of unincorporated Henrico County, Virginia. The mascot of Hermitage High School is the panther.  Hermitage High School has athletic facilities with a concrete football stadium and a rubber-turf track.

History
Initially, Hermitage High School began in 1936 as the Glen Allen High School, which was located at the present-day site of the Glen Allen Cultural Arts Center off Mountain Road. The building that is now George H. Moody Middle School was opened in 1951 as Hermitage High School. The current Hermitage High School was opened in 1972 and is located in the Brookland District.

Demographics
Out of 1,717 students enrolled in fall of 2022, 40.8% were Black, 25.1% White, 22.2% Hispanic, 5.6% Asian, 5.6% Multiple Races, 0.4% American Indian, and 0.1% Native Hawaiian.

Technical center
Hermitage is also home to the Advanced Career Education Center, which is one of only two in the county. Students apply to the program at the end of their sophomore or junior year and are selected to take tech courses in the afternoon or morning. The ACE Center enables students to gain hands-on experience and education in specific fields, preparing them to join the workforce with career and technical certifications immediately after graduating.

Sports medicine program
Within the Advanced Career Education Center is the sports medicine program. Students receive training in first aid and CPR, and are able to gain hands on experience working closely with school athletic trainers and sports players.

Extra Curricular Activities
Hermitage is home to many athletic teams/sports including football, baseball, basketball, wrestling, cross country, indoor and outdoor Track, soccer, field hockey, volleyball, golf, tennis and softball, along with cheerleading.

Hermitage is also home to a thriving Fine Arts program. It offers courses in Visual Arts, Theatre, Creative Writing, Chorus and Band.

It is also home to the music programs such as symphonic band, concert band, marching band and orchestra. The music program is a 30 time Virginia honor band and honor band hall of fame member.

Notable alumni
Shawn Barber, former NFL player for the Washington Redskins and later a coaching intern for the Philadelphia Eagles, a team he had two separate stints playing for.
Duane Brown, NFL Player and first round pick for the Houston Texans.
Curtis Grant, top recruit in the Class of 2011, formerly played for the San Diego Chargers 
 Chris Copeland, NBA player.
Derrick Green, rated by Rivals.com and Scout.com as the No. 1 running back in the country in the Class of 2013, played for the Michigan Wolverines football team
Queen Harrison, U.S. Olympic Team 2008 Track and field.
Orlando Jordan, Former Professional Wrestler for the WWE and TNA Wrestling
Fontel Mines, Former NFL player for the Chicago Bears.
Darren Sharper, Former NFL player for the Green Bay Packers, Minnesota Vikings and lastly the New Orleans Saints, the team that won Super Bowl XLIV.
Jamie Sharper, Former NFL player for the Baltimore Ravens, when they won Super Bowl XXXV. He later played for the Houston Texans and Seattle Seahawks
Josh Vaughan, NFL Player, formerly of the Atlanta Falcons and Carolina Panthers
Shanon Slack, Professional MMA fighter for Bellator Fighting Championship, 2008 U.S. Olympic Alternate Wrestler, Wrestling coach for Team Cruz on the Ultimate Fighter Season 15 on FOX

References

External links
 

Public high schools in Virginia
Schools in Henrico County, Virginia
Educational institutions established in 1952
1952 establishments in Virginia